Rasulpur Brahmanan  is a village in Kapurthala district of Punjab State, India. The village is administrated by a Sarpanch, who is an elected representative.

Demography 
According to the report published by Census India in 2011, Rasulpur Brahmanan has 25 houses with the total population of 148 persons of which 68 are male and 80 females. Literacy rate of Rasulpur Brahmanan is 76.15%, higher than the state average of 75.84%.  The population of children in the age group 0–6 years is 18 which is 12.16% of the total population. Child sex ratio is approximately 800, lower than the state average of 846.

Population data

References

External links
  Villages in Kapurthala
 Kapurthala Villages List

Villages in Kapurthala district